UB11 may refer to:

 UB11, a postcode district in the UB postcode area
 SM UB-11, a World War I German submarine